Laali Ki Shaadi Mein Laaddoo Deewana is a 2017 Hindi-language, Indian romantic drama comedy film, written and directed by Manish Harishankar, and produced by TP Aggarwal and Rahul Aggarwal, Executive Producer Vishal Singh The film stars Vivaan Shah, Akshara Haasan, Gurmeet Choudhary & Kavitta verma in pivotal roles. The teaser posters of the film were released on 20 February 2017 while the Trailer was launched on YouTube on 27 February 2017. The film released on 7 April 2017 to negative reviews from critics and audiences alike.

Plot 
Laaddoo (Vivaan Shah) is a middle class ambitious lad whose dreams are as big as the Tatas and Birlas. After convincing his father, he moves down to Vadodara where he starts working as a waiter in his father's friend Kabir's cafetaria.

There one day, he bumps into Laali (Akshara Haasan) and immediately falls for her charm in slow motion. The girl is a regular customer at Kabir's Cafe. Soon, they fall in love faster than a right swipe on Tinder and romantic numbers are thrown in the film at the speed of light. Before you could digest their contrived romance, the P-word drops in the conversation. Laali discovers that she is pregnant with Laaddoo's child. On the other hand, our lover boy gives her the most convenient solution since he prefers chasing his dreams rather than being a father.

'Main thappad khaane waali ladki nahi hu' says the girl and plants a slap on Laaddoo's face. Hearts are broken and you already know how where it's heading. But then what's a romantic film without a love triangle? So, there you have the Prince of Ramnagar, Veer (Gurmeet Choudhary) who decides to marry Laali but hey the reason for his 'so-called' noble act is ridiculous as hell. The man lost his parents and fiance in an accident and their family priest now wants him to tie the knot with a pregnant woman as it would be auspicious for his royal family.

Meanwhile our lover boy is repenting his act and wants to patch with Laali. Who will she chose- Laaddoo or the stinky rich Veer.

Cast 

Akshara Haasan as Laali
Vivaan Shah as Laddoo
Gurmeet Choudhary as Prince Veer
 Kavitta Verma as Palak
Saurabh Shukla as Laali's Father
Sanjay Mishra as Kabir
Darshan Jariwala as Laddoo's Father
Ravi Kishan as A crooked corporate executive
Suhasini Mulay as Veer's Grandmother
Navni Parihar as Laddoo's Mother
Kishori Shahane as Laali's Mother
Jyoti Kalash as Kishor Kumar
 Ehshan Khan as Singh Ji

Soundtrack

Critical reception

Nihit Bhave of The Times of India gave the film a rating of 1.5 out of 5 and said that, "Akshara and Vivaan deliver embarrassingly over-the-top performances. The film is structured so that you connect all the dots within half an hour and are then left with a whole lot nothing to look forward to." Sreehari Nair of Rediff gave the film a rating of 1.5 out of 5 and said that, "Laali Ki Shaadi Mein Laaddoo Deewana is insipid, terribly made, and yet a Warm Enterprise". Saibal Chatterjee of NDTV gave the film a rating of 1.5 out of 5 saying that, "Akshara Haasan's film is a tedious rom-com that fails to shrug off its loopy quality despite a few entertaining performances". Mohar Basu of Mid-Day gave the film a rating of 1 out of 5 and said that, "Director Manish Ravishankar wanted to give us a Rajshri-styled dramedy with a Kya Kehna twist. But it's boring, unfunny and utterly ridiculous. If you survive the first hour, you might just get a gallantry award."

References

External links
 

2017 films
Films scored by Vipin Patwa
Films scored by Arko Pravo Mukherjee
Films about marriage
2017 comedy-drama films
2010s Hindi-language films
Indian comedy-drama films